Asymphorodes holoporphyra is a moth of the family Agonoxenidae. It was described by Edward Meyrick in 1934. It is found on the Marquesas Archipelago.

References

Moths described in 1934
Agonoxeninae
Moths of Oceania
Endemic fauna of French Polynesia
Taxa named by Edward Meyrick